Cam Ward (born March 24, 1971) is an American politician who served as a Republican member of the Alabama Senate, representing District 14 from 2010 to 2020. He previously represented District 49 of the Alabama House of Representatives from 2002 to 2010.

Biography
Ward was born in Milton, Florida and graduated from Bradford County High School in Starke, Florida. He received an undergraduate degree (international relations and political science) from Troy University and a J.D. degree from the Cumberland School of Law at Samford University. While at Troy, Ward served two terms as Student Government Association president.

Ward is the executive director of the Industrial Development Board of Alabaster, Alabama. He is chairman of the Autism Task Force of Alabama and helped launch Autism Alabama, "an on-line library providing distance learning for teachers who have children on the autism spectrum."

Career
Shortly after his daughter Riley was born in 2002, Ward was elected to the Alabama House of Representatives for District 49, where he served two terms. In 2010, he was elected to the Alabama Senate, representing District 14.

In December 2010, Ward supported a piece of legislation granting Subpoena Power to the Alabama Ethics Commission. The bill passed both chambers of the Alabama Legislature on December 16, 2010, and was signed into law by Governor Bob Riley.

In 2015, Ward was arrested for DUI and admitted to guilt. He apologized  and entered a pre-trial diversion program for first-time offenders. Shortly after, he announced an amicable divorce from his wife of 23 years, Julie Cain, on Facebook.

In 2016, Ward was recognized by the Foundation for Government Accountability with the "Friend of Government Accountability Award" for his efforts in healthcare reform.

In 2017, the Center for Legislative Energy and Environmental Research announced Senator Ward as its chairman for 2017–2018.

In May 2019, he voted to make abortion a crime at any stage in a pregnancy, with no exemptions for cases of rape or incest.

Career timeline
 Director of the Alabama Bureau of Pardons and Paroles-(2020–present)
Alabama State Senate– (2010–2020)
 Alabama House of Representatives– (2002–2010)
 Executive Director, Alabaster Industrial Development Board– (2001–present)
 District Director of Congressman Spencer Bachus– (1998–2001)
 Assistant Alabama Secretary of State– (1998)
 Deputy Attorney General, State Auditors Office– (1996–1998)
 Alabama Republican Party, Political Staff Assistant– (1994–1996)
 Office of Governor Guy Hunt, Legislative Intern– (1993)

Standing committees
 Judiciary– Chairman
 Fiscal Responsibility and Economic Development– Vice-chairman
 Government Appropriations (former member)
 Health and Human Services
 Finance and Taxation General Fund
 Transportation & Energy
 Constitution Ethics & Elections
 Confirmations
 Shelby County Local Legislation– Chairman
 Jefferson County Local Legislation (former member)

Oversight committees 
 Alabama Law Institute– President
 New National Veterans Cemetery Joint Legislative Committee
 Legislative Council
 Joint Interim Committee on Open Meetings Legislation
 Joint Legislative Prison Committee
 Joint Reapportionment Committee
 Joint Oversight of Public Accounts
 Joint Oversight for Energy Policy– Chairman
 Nuclear Energy Activities and Hazardous Chemical Toxic Waste Oversight Committee
 Joint Oversight for State Parks
 Joint Oversight for Prisons
 Joint Prison Reform Task Force– Chairman
 Judicial Building Authority Legislative Oversight Committee
 Alabama Juvenile Justice Task Force
 Sentencing Commission
 Alabama Autism Council– Chairman

National committees 
 Center for Legislative Energy and Environmental Research– Chairman
 U.S./Canada Energy Council–Executive Committee
 National Conference for State Legislators Energy, Transportation, Agriculture Committee– Chairman
 Council of State Governments–Committee on Suggested Legislation– Board of Trustees
 Faith & Justice Fellowship– State Leader
 Justice Reinvestment Council
 National Commission on Uniform State Laws
 Southern States Energy Board
 Southern Legislative Conference–Executive Committee

Party offices 
 Alabama Republican Party Executive Committee

Recognition 
 Autism Speaks– 2017 Legislator of the Year
 Alabama League of Municipalities– Hometown Hero
 Business Council of Alabama– 2016 Business Champion
 Foundation for Government Accountability– 2016 Friend of Government Accountability Award
 Business Council of Alabama– 2015 Business Champion
 Alabama Senior Citizens Hall of Fame– 2013 Statesman of the Year

References

External links

 
 Alabama State Senate – State Sen. Cam Ward
 Project Vote Smart –  State Rep. Cam Ward
 
 Political profile at Bama Politics

1971 births
Living people
People from Milton, Florida
Troy University alumni
Cumberland School of Law alumni
Alabama lawyers
21st-century American politicians
Republican Party Alabama state senators
Republican Party members of the Alabama House of Representatives
2008 United States presidential electors